The 2007 Wests Tigers season was the 8th in the joint-venture club's history. They competed in the National Rugby League's 2007 Telstra Premiership, finishing in 9th position and failing to reach the play-offs.

Season summary 

The Wests Tigers had a poor start to the season, losing their first four matches (three of them by very narrow margins.) The Tigers finally won their first game of the season in Round 5 against Cronulla Sharks, at Campbelltown Stadium, by 2 points in golden point extra time. Although Benji Marshall again injured a shoulder in round 8, the Tigers continued winning through to round 12 when they lost to Parramatta by 30 points. Injuries to key players continued throughout the season - Benji Marshall out for eleven rounds, Brett Hodgson out for seven rounds with a fractured cheek, and Todd Payten, Paul Whatuira and Bryce Gibbs all missing several games.

After spending sixteen rounds in the top eight, the Tigers dropped down to ninth position when they lost to the South Sydney Rabbitohs in round 24. Facing the Newcastle Knights (a team desperate to avoid the wooden spoon in their own horror season) in the last match of the regular season, the Tigers needed to win and then hope the Broncos lost to the Eels to regain a position in the eight. Although they led twice in the game by a margin of twelve points, the Tigers' finished an inconsistent season on a disappointing loss to the Knights, 24–26 at Telstra Stadium, and in 9th position on the ladder.

2007 Season results

2007 Season ladder

Players Used 

As at 22 July 2007:
 (Debut: Round 19)

 (Debut: Round 16)

 (Debut: Round 8)

 (Debut: Round 1)

 (Debut: Round 9)

Gains and losses

References 

Wests Tigers seasons
Wests Tigers season